José Luis Rodríguez Aguilar (born 1 June 1994) is a Chilean cyclist, who currently rides for UCI Continental team .

Major results

2012
 1st  Time trial, National Junior Road Championships
2013
 1st  Time trial, Pan American Under-23 Road Championships
 National Under-23 Road Championships
1st  Road race
1st  Time trial
2014
 National Under-23 Road Championships
1st  Road race
1st  Time trial
 1st Overall Volta Ciclística Internacional do Rio Grande do Sul
1st Young rider classification
 1st Stage 3 Vuelta a Mendoza
 Pan American Under-23 Road Championships
4th Time trial
7th Road race
 6th Time trial, South American Games
2015
 National Road Championships
1st  Road race
1st  Under-23 road race
1st  Under-23 time trial
 1st Stage 1 Vuelta de la Leche
 Pan American Under-23 Road Championships
2nd  Road race
3rd  Time trial
2016
 Pan American Under-23 Road Championships
1st  Time trial
1st  Road race
 1st  Time trial, National Road Championships
 9th Overall Giro della Valle d'Aosta
2017
 1st  Time trial, Pan American Road Championships
 National Road Championships
1st  Road race
1st  Time trial
2019
 1st  Time trial, National Road Championships
 2nd  Time trial, Pan American Road Championships
 Pan American Games
3rd  Time trial
7th Road race
 10th Overall Vuelta Ciclista a Chiloe
2021
 National Road Championships
1st  Road race
1st  Time trial
 2nd  Time trial, Pan American Road Championships
2021
 National Road Championships
1st  Time trial

References

External links

1994 births
Living people
Chilean male cyclists
Cyclists at the 2016 Summer Olympics
Olympic cyclists of Chile
Pan American Games medalists in cycling
Pan American Games bronze medalists for Chile
Cyclists at the 2019 Pan American Games
Medalists at the 2019 Pan American Games
People from Aysén Region
20th-century Chilean people
21st-century Chilean people